Hoplandria is a genus of rove beetles in the family Staphylinidae. There are about 13 described species in Hoplandria.

Species
These 13 species belong to the genus Hoplandria:

 Hoplandria alternans Génier, 1989 i c g
 Hoplandria guadeloupensis Pace, 1987 g
 Hoplandria isabellae Génier, 1989 i c g
 Hoplandria kisatchie Génier, 1989 i c g
 Hoplandria klimaszewskii Génier, 1989 i c g
 Hoplandria laevicollis (Notman, 1920) i c g
 Hoplandria laeviventris Casey, 1910 i c g
 Hoplandria lateralis (Melsheimer, 1844) i c g b
 Hoplandria oconee Génier, 1989 i c g
 Hoplandria okaloosa Génier, 1989 i c g
 Hoplandria pulchra Kraatz, 1857 i c g
 Hoplandria sanbornei Génier, 1989 i c g
 Hoplandria smetanai Génier, 1989 i c g

Data sources: i = ITIS, c = Catalogue of Life, g = GBIF, b = Bugguide.net

References

Further reading

External links

 

Aleocharinae